The Tupolev Tu-2 (development names ANT-58 and 103; NATO reporting name Bat) was a twin-engine Soviet high-speed daylight and frontline (SDB and FB)  bomber aircraft of World War II vintage. The Tu-2 was tailored to meet a requirement for a high-speed bomber or dive-bomber, with a large internal bombload, and speed similar to that of a single-seat fighter. Designed to challenge the German Junkers Ju 88, the Tu-2 proved comparable, and was produced in torpedo, interceptor, and reconnaissance versions. The Tu-2 was one of the outstanding combat aircraft of World War II and it played a key role in the Red Army's final offensives.

Design and development
In 1937, Andrei Tupolev, along with many Soviet designers at the time, was arrested on trumped-up charges of activities against the State. Despite the actions of the Soviet government, he was considered important to the war effort and following his imprisonment, he was placed in charge of a team that was to design military aircraft. Designed as Samolyot (Russian: "aircraft") 103, the Tu-2 was based on earlier ANT-58, ANT-59 and ANT-60 light bomber prototypes. Essentially an upscaled and more powerful ANT-60 powered by AM-37 engines, the first prototype was completed at Factory N156, and made its first test flight on 29 January 1941, piloted by Mikhail Nukhtinov.
Mass production began in September 1941, at Omsk Aircraft Factory Number 166, with the first aircraft reaching combat units in March 1942. Modifications were made based on combat experience, and Plant Number 166 built a total of 80 aircraft. The AM-37 engine was abandoned to concentrate efforts on the AM-38F for the Il-2, which required Tupolev to redesign the aircraft for an available engine. Modifications of this bomber to the ASh-82 engine as well as improving the general design for simpler manufacturing took well into 1943 with production restarting in late 1943. Wartime production of the new variant was about 800 aircraft (up to June 1945) with an overall production of 2460 aircraft until 1952, the majority of them by aircraft factory number 23 in Moscow.

Operational history
Built from 1941 to 1948, the Tu-2 was the USSR's second most important twin-engine bomber (the first being the Petlyakov Pe-2). The design brought Andrei Tupolev back into favour after a period of detention. Crews were universally happy with their Tupolevs. Pilots could maneuver the aircraft like a fighter, it could survive heavy damage, and it was fast. 
The first Soviet unit to be equipped with the Tu-2 was 132nd Bomber Aviation Regiment of 3rd Air Army. The aircraft had its baptism of fire over Velikiye Luki. There, in  November–December 1942, this Tupolev bomber flew 46 sorties. On February 11, 1943, 132 BAP was transferred to 17 VA to support the drive toward River Dnepr and it flew another 47 sorties - attacking airfields and rail junctions - until April 13, when the unit was removed from frontline. By that time only three Tu-2s were lost in action, while seven were damaged.
The Tu-2 remained in service in the USSR until 1950.

Some surplus Tu-2s were provided to the Chinese People's Liberation Army Air Force for use in the Chinese Civil War. Some Chinese Tu-2s were shot down by United Nations airmen during the Korean War. In the 1958–1962 'counter-riot actions' in the 1959 Tibetan uprising in Qinghai-Tibet Plateau covering Qinghai, Tibet, southern Gansu, and western Sichuan, Chinese PLAAF Tu-2s took on the roles of ground-attack, reconnaissance and liaison. The Chinese Tu-2s were retired at the end of the 1970s.

After World War II, the Tu-2 proved to be an ideal test aircraft for various powerplants, including the first generation of Soviet jet engines.

Variants

"Aircraft 103" (ANT-58) The initial three-seat version. Two  Mikulin AM-37 (water cooled V-12), 1941.
"Aircraft 103U" (ANT-59) Redesigned for four-seat crew (influenced by Junkers Ju 88). It used the same engines as the ANT-58.
"Aircraft 103V" (ANT-60) As ANT-59 but powered by air-cooled Shvetsov ASh-82 engines after the AM-37 was cancelled.
"Aircraft 104" Tu-2S modified for interceptor role.
ANT-64 Long-range four-engine heavy bomber project developed from the Tu-2, cancelled in favor of Tu-4.
ANT-66 52-seat airliner variant of ANT-64.
SDB (ANT-63) High-speed day bomber prototype.
Tu-1 (ANT-63R) Prototype three-seat night fighter version.
Tu-2 Two  Shvetsov ASh-82 (air cooling) with bigger drag, 1942.
Tu-2D (ANT-62) Long-range version, it appeared in October 1944. It had an increased span and a crew of five aviators. Powered by two  Shvetsov ASh-82FN, 1943
Tu-2D (ANT-67) Five-seat long-range bomber similar to ANT-62 but powered by Charomskiy ACh-30BF diesel engines, 1946.
Tu-2DB (ANT-65) High-altitude reconnaissance bomber version developed from the Tu-2D, powered by two turbo-supercharged Mikulin AM-44TK engines.
Tu-2F Photo-reconnaissance version.
Tu-2G High-speed cargo transport version.
Tu-2K Only two aircraft were built for testing ejection seats.
Tu-2LL Tu-2's modified as testbeds.
Tu-2M (ANT-61M) Powered by two  ASh-83 radial piston engines.
Tu-2N Engine testbed, built to test the Rolls-Royce Nene turbojet engine.
Tu-2 Paravan Two aircraft built to test barrage balloon cable cutters and deflectors.
Tu-2R Reconnaissance version.
Tu-2RShR Prototype, armed with  cannon in the forward fuselage.
Tu-2S Powered by two  Shvetsov ASh-82FN radial piston engines, 1943.
Tu-2S RLS PNB-4 Secretive night-fighter prototype developed under leadership of the NKVD special section of V. Morgunov and P. Kuksenko. Equipped with the Soviet Gneiss 5 (Гнейс 5) radar. Armed with two NS-45 autocannons. Development presumed to have started in 1943. Precursor of the Tu-1.
Tu-2Sh Experimental ground-attack version. Two variants were tested in 1944: one with a  centerline gun and another with a battery of 88  PPSh-41 submachine guns fixed in the bomb bay, directed to fire ahead at a 30-degree angle. Another version under this designation was tested in 1946; this one had a frontal armament consisting of two NS-37 and two NS-45 autocannons.
Tu-2T (ANT-62T) Torpedo-bomber variant based on the Tu-2S, was tested between February and March 1945, and issued to Soviet Naval Aviation units.
Tu-2U Trainer version.
Tu-6 Reconnaissance prototype, 1946.
Tu-8 (ANT-69) Long-range bomber based on Tu-2D, 1947.
Tu-10 (ANT-68) It was a high-altitude variant that saw limited service, 1943. Also known as Tu-4.
Tu-12 Medium-range jet bomber prototype, 1947.
UTB Bomber trainer with Shvetsov ASh-21 engines of  created by the Sukhoi OKB in 1946

Operators

World War II operators

Soviet Air Force

Postwar operators

Bulgarian Air Force

People's Liberation Army Air Force Imported 33 UTB-2 and 29 T-2U trainers at the end of 1949.  The last four UTB-2s retired in 1965. Imported 311 Tu-2s from the end of 1949 to 1952. The last 30 Tu-2s retired in 1982.

Hungarian Air Force

Indonesian Air Force

North Korean Air Force

Polish Air Force (eight aircraft in 1949-early 1960s)
Polish Navy

Romanian Air Force (six delivered in 1950: two Tu-2s, two Tu-2 trainers and two Tu-6s)

Soviet Air Force

Aircraft on display
Bulgaria
 On static display at the Bulgarian Museum of Aviation in Plovdiv. It is a Tu-2T, tactical number 27.
China
 On static display at the Beijing Air and Space Museum in Beijing.
 On static display at the Military Museum of the Chinese People's Revolution in Beijing.
 On static display at the Chinese Aviation Museum in Beijing.
 On static display at the Chinese Aviation Museum in Beijing.
Poland
 Tu-2S on static display at the Polish Aviation Museum in Kraków, Lesser Poland. It was used for testing ejection seats.
 Tu-2S on static display at the Museum of the Polish Army in Warsaw, Mazovia. It was used by the 7th Independent Dive Bomber Regiment ("7 samodzielny pułk lotniczy bombowców nurkujących").
Russia
 On static display at the Central Air Force Museum in Monino, Moscow.
 Under restoration to airworthy condition for the Wings of Victory Foundation in Moscow.
United States
 On static display at the War Eagles Air Museum in Santa Teresa, New Mexico.
 In storage at the Fantasy of Flight in Polk City, Florida.

Specifications (Tu-2 2M-82)

See also

Notes

Bibliography
 Bergström, Christer. Black Cross – Red Star, Air War over the Eastern Front. Volume 4. Stalingrad to Kuban. Vaktel Books, 2019. 
 Bishop, Chris. The Encyclopedia of Weapons of WWII: The Comprehensive Guide to Over 1,500 Weapons Systems, Including Tanks, Small Arms, Warplanes, Artillery, Ships, and Submarines. New York: Sterling, 2002. .

 Ethell, Jeffrey L. Aircraft of World War II. Glasgow: HarperCollins/Jane's, 1995. .
 Jackson, Robert. Aircraft of World War II: Development, Weaponry, Specifications: Leicester, UK: Amber Books, 2003. .
 Leonard, Herbert. Encyclopaedia of Soviet Fighters 1939–1951. Paris: Histoire & Collections, 2005. .
 Munson, Kenneth. Aircraft of World War II. New York: Doubleday and Company, 1972. .

External links

 https://web.archive.org/web/20110605015707/http://www.aviation.ru/Tu/#2
 Walkaround of Tu-2 from Monino Museum, Russia
 Tu-2 on World War II Warbirds
 Tu-2 aircraft family
 Photo of Tu-2 with PPSh in bomb bay

Tu-0002
1940s Soviet bomber aircraft
Twin piston-engined tractor aircraft
World War II Soviet medium bombers
Mid-wing aircraft
Aircraft first flown in 1941